SF Succé was a Swedish premium movie channel that operated in the late 1980s and early 1990s. It was owned by Warner Bros. (whose parent company  Warner Communications was in the process of merging with Time Inc. to form Time Warner, now Warner Bros. Discovery), Canal Plus (France's pay TV channel, in turn owned by what was then Compagnie générale des eaux (CGE), now Vivendi), Svensk Filmindustri and Marieberg (a newspaper publisher), which each held a 25 percent share.

The channel went on air from a satellite operated by Intelsat, specifically Intelsat VA-F11 (the latter series being the predecessor of the SSL 1300 series by this satellite's manufacturer Space Systems Loral, now Maxar Technologies), on December 1, 1989. At launch, a subscription cost 120 Swedish krona and the channel was on-air for about 60 hours per week, mostly in the evenings and weekend mornings.

In 1991, it was purchased and subsequently merged with TV1000. TV1000's owners, Kinnevik, would own 75 percent of the company, while SF Succé's owners got the remaining 25 percent. The merged channel launched on September 1, 1991 under the name TV1000 - Succékanalen.

The SF brand makes a return as a television channel in Sweden on October 1, 2009, when Svensk Filmindustri and TV1000's competitor Canal+ together launch SF-kanalen, a channel with only Swedish films. Both Svensk Filmindustri and the Nordic Canal+ branch are now owned by the same company.

References

External links

Defunct television channels in Sweden
Television channels and stations established in 1989
Television channels and stations disestablished in 1991